Záskalie is a village and municipality in Považská Bystrica District in the Trenčín Region of north-western Slovakia.

History
In historical records the village was first mentioned in 1379.

Geography
The municipality lies at an altitude of 185 metres and covers an area of 2.388 km². It has a population of about 485 people.

References

External links

 
http://www.statistics.sk/mosmis/eng/run.html

Villages and municipalities in Považská Bystrica District